Ivancea is a commune in Orhei District, Moldova. It is composed of three villages: Brănești, Furceni and Ivancea.

Notable people
 Matei Donici

References

Communes of Orhei District